p-Anisidine (or para-anisidine) is an organic compound with the formula CH3OC6H4NH2. A white solid, commercial samples can appear grey-brown owing to air oxidation.  It is one of three isomers of anisidine, methoxy-containing anilines.  It is prepared by reduction of 4-nitroanisole.

Anisidine value
p-Anisidine condenses readily with aldehydes and ketones to form Schiff bases, which absorb at 350 nm. This colorimetric reaction is used to test for the presence of oxidation products in fats and oils, an official method for detecting them by the American Oil Chemists' Society.  It is particularly good at detecting unsaturated aldehydes, which are the ones that are most likely to generate unacceptable flavors, making it particularly useful in food quality testing.

Safety
p-Anisidine is a relatively toxic compound with a permissible exposure limit of 0.5 mg/m3.

References

External links 

Anilines
Hazardous air pollutants
IARC Group 3 carcinogens